Where Did They Go, Lord? is a song by Elvis Presley. It was recorded on September 22, 1970, and adapted from Dallas Frazier's original version. It first appeared on a 1971 single as the B-side to Elvis' recording of "Rags to Riches" (RCA Victor 47–9980). It was first released on LP on the 1978 compilation album He Walks Beside Me.

References

Elvis Presley songs
Songs written by A.L. "Doodle" Owens
Songs written by Dallas Frazier
1970 songs